The Pinery is an unincorporated community and a census-designated place (CDP) located in and governed by Douglas County, Colorado, United States. The CDP is a part of the Denver–Aurora–Lakewood, CO Metropolitan Statistical Area. The population of The Pinery CDP was 10,517 at the United States Census 2010. Douglas County governs the unincorporated community. The Parker post office (Zip Code 80134) serves the area.

Geography
The Pinery is bordered to the north by the town of Parker and to the southwest by the town of Castle Rock, the Douglas County seat. Colorado State Highway 83 runs through the center of the CDP, leading north  to the center of Parker and south 4 miles to Franktown.

Demographics

The United States Census Bureau initially defined  for the

Education
The Douglas County School District serves the Pinery.

See also

Outline of Colorado
Index of Colorado-related articles
State of Colorado
Colorado cities and towns
Colorado census designated places
Colorado counties
Douglas County, Colorado
List of statistical areas in Colorado
Front Range Urban Corridor
North Central Colorado Urban Area
Denver-Aurora-Boulder, CO Combined Statistical Area
Denver-Aurora-Broomfield, CO Metropolitan Statistical Area

References

External links

The Pinery Homeowners' Association
The Pinery Country Club
Douglas County website

Census-designated places in Douglas County, Colorado
Census-designated places in Colorado
Denver metropolitan area